Wandrei is a surname. Notable people with the surname include:

Donald Wandrei (1908–1987), American writer, poet, and editor
Howard Wandrei (1909–1956), American writer